Women in law in Japan work in the legal profession as lawyers. Women lawyers work in private practice, in-house, in government, and in the citizenship sector.

Background 
Women were not allowed to practice law under the Lawyers Law of 1893.  That rule stated that a lawyer must be a Japanese man, aged 20 or older, and have legal capacity under the Civil Code. The Japanese Imperial Constitution did not guarantee women's suffrage or equality between men and women. A married woman's legal capacity was subject to her husband's consent. At the time, people seemed to have taken it for granted that women should be excluded from the legal profession. In 1933, the Women's Suffrage Alliance lobbied the Research Committee on the Amendment of the Lawyers Law to allow women to become lawyers. When the new law went into effect in 1936, 19 women took the bar exam. In 1938, three women passed the bar to become lawyers: Ai Kume, Masako Nakata, and Yoshiko Mibuchi. In 1940, all three women became qualified lawyers after completing their internship.

The only institution where women could obtain a legal education was the Women's College of Meiji University. In welcoming the first entering class, Hideo Yokota, Chief Justice of the Supreme Court, called upon female lawyers and economists to work to improve women's status in Japan.

Notable individuals 
Masako Nakata, Yoshiko Mibuchi, and Ai Kume (1940): First women to become qualified as lawyers. Al Kume worked at a private practice in Tokyo and also served as a representative of the Japanese government. Akio Kume was the first woman to be recommended by the bar association as a candidate on the Supreme Court in 1976. Due to her sudden death the appointment did not become reality. Masako Nakata worked in private practice in Tottori Prefecture and became the first female president of the local bar association in 1969.

Yoshiko Miuchio became one of the first two female judges, then later became the first female judge of the Niigata Family Court in 1972.

Yoshie Tateshi became the first Japanese woman to graduate with a doctorate in law. After hearing Hideo Yokota's speech about making women's society better in Japan, she was determined to do so.

Hisako Takahashi was the first woman justice on the Supreme Court of Japan. Prior to her appointment, she was a high ranking Minister of Labor.

Women lawyers associations 
Today in Japan, there is a network of women lawyers called "Women in Law Japan". This network includes international and domestic women in the legal profession in Japan. Catherine O’Connell is the president of Women in Law Japan. She is the first foreign woman to set up her own law practice in Tokyo. Riki Beppu is a founding member and chair of Women in Law Japan. She has 20 years experience in advising in corporate law.

References 

Wikipedia Student Program
Japan
law
Law of Japan